The 1988 United States Senate election in Minnesota was held on November 8, 1988. Incumbent Republican U.S. Senator David Durenberger won re-election to his second full term. He was challenged by democratic Hubert "Skip" Humphrey III, the son of former vice president Hubert Humphrey. The seat had previously been held by both of Skip Humphrey's parents.

Major candidates

Democratic 
 Skip Humphrey, Attorney General of Minnesota and former State Senator

Republican 
 David Durenberger, incumbent U.S. Senator since 1978

Results

See also 
 1988 United States Senate elections

References 

1988 Minnesota elections
Minnesota
1988